Cophomantella syngonarcha is a moth in the family Lecithoceridae. It was described by Edward Meyrick in 1926. It is known from Uganda.

The wingspan is about 28 mm. The forewings are dark violet fuscous with a faint ochreous-whitish dot on the costa at three-fourths. The hindwings are dark grey.

References

Moths described in 1926
Cophomantella
Taxa named by Edward Meyrick